Park Ji-hoon (Korean: 박지훈; born March 14, 2000) also known by the mononym Jihoon, is a South Korean singer and one of two leaders of Treasure with Choi Hyun-suk under YG Entertainment. He debuted with the band on August 7, 2020, and its single album entitled The First Step: Chapter One.

Life and career

2000–2016: Early life 
Park Ji-hoon was born on March 14, 2000, in Nam District, Busan, South Korea as the youngest of two sons. Albeit he enjoyed singing from a young age, Jihoon did not intend to pursue the role of a singer until he encountered the YG Entertainment documentary series WIN: Who Is Next (2013) in seventh grade of middle school at age 14 (Korean age). It showcased two teams — currently active as Winner and iKon — who competed for their debut. Initiating his dream to join and debut under the label, Jihoon was accepted into YG Entertainment's trainee program in 2016, following his audition.

2017–present: Debut with Treasure and solo endeavors 

Jihoon first appeared on television in Stray Kids (2017) as a representative of his agency with Bang Ye-dam and Doyoung amidst others. In March 2018, his trainee status was revoked due to lack of progress, leading to his departure and training elsewhere. He was later invited by YG Entertainment to partake as a contestant on YG Treasure Box (2018–2019) as part of Team B. While he failed to claim a position in the final septet, he was the fifth to be placed in a second line-up called "Magnum". The septet and sextet were subsequently merged and became the eventual 12-piece band, Treasure. He served as an "unofficial leader" with Choi Hyun-suk in their respective teams in the midst of training due to the number of people. With four years of training, his debut in Treasure followed on August 7, 2020, with the single album entitled The First Step: Chapter One. The band adopted the two-tier leadership with Jihoon and Choi after witnessing positive results from the once temporary system.

Amidst his activities with the band, Jihoon served as a host for Inkigayo with Ahn Yu-jin of Ive and Sungchan of NCT for a tenure lasting between 2021–2022. He was also cast by the South Korean director Na Young-seok and Ha Moo-sung to appear on their series The Idol Ramyeonators (2022) with Choi Hyun-suk.

Public image 
Jihoon debuted on the Gaon Social Chart 2.0, which integrates data from SMR, YouTube, Mubeat, V Live and My Celebs to calibrate a ranking among fifty artists, for the month of October in 2020. He also appeared on the Korean Business Research Institute's male celebrity brand reputation list, a chart that records Korean celebrities with the most online searches and engagements, and reached the top 50 for the month of March in 2021.

Artistry

Influences 
Jihoon has cited senior label-mate Big Bang as his musical influence, with member Taeyang captivating most of his focus.

Filmography

Web series

Television shows

Hosting

References 

2000 births
Living people
Musicians from Busan
People from Busan
K-pop singers
Treasure (band) members
South Korean male idols
South Korean dance musicians
YG Entertainment artists
21st-century South Korean  male singers
Japanese-language singers of South Korea